Nozipho Mxakato-Diseko (1 November 1956) is a South African diplomat. She is currently the United Nations Ambassador for South Africa. For the Paris Agreement, Mxakato-Diseko was the leader of the G77 bloc during negotiations.

Biography 
Mxakato-Diseko was born in Johannesburg on 1 November 1956. She attended Somerville College, Oxford and has a doctorate in philosophy which she earned in 1991. She worked as a campaigner for the African National Congress (ANC) and also as an activist in Soweto for the ANC. She also raised money for the British Defence and Aid Fund.

Mxakato-Diseko began as a representative of South Africa at the International Atomic Energy Agency in the mid-1990s. She has been the South African negotiator since 2011.

References 

1956 births
People from Johannesburg
South African women ambassadors
Permanent Representatives of South Africa to the United Nations
Living people
Alumni of Somerville College, Oxford